The Battle of Kakor (Kakkor) was fought between the Maratha empire led by the veteran Gandadhar Tantiya ordered by [[Malhar Rao Holkar]]  and the Rajput Kingdom of Jaipur under [[Sawai Madho Singh]] in present-day Kakor, Uniara, Tonk district of Rajasthan

Background
When Jankoji Rao Scindia laid siege on the fortress of Ranthambore, Mahtaji and Mirzaji, the commanders in charge of the fortress where determined to lose the fort to the Marathas. Eventually they lost hopes as the Mughal emperor did not send help to protect the fortress from falling into Maratha hands. Thakur Anup Singh Khangarot (brother of Pahar Singh Khangarot of Dudu), using his political genius and tact, started negotiations with Mahtaji and Mirzaji to get hold of the fortress of Ranthambore under the control of Maharaja Sawai Madho Singh ji of Jaipur.  He was successful in getting hold of the fortress which resulted in making the Marathas uncomfortable. This step of Maharaja of Jaipur angered Peshwa Balaji Bajirao. The Peshwa asked Malhar Rao Holkar to lay siege on the fortress of Ranthambore and capture it from the Maharaja of Jaipur. Malhar Rao ordered the veteran Gangadhar Tantiya to lay siege on the fortress.

Battle
In the year of 1759, in order to lay siege on the fortress of Ranthambore, the Marathas under Gangadhar Tantiya (chandra-chud) marched towards the fortress and set their camp at Kakor. This is where Tantiya and his forces came under a fierce attack by the Rajput forces of Jaipur state under Thakur Jodh Singhji Nathawat of Choumu, Rawal Ram Singji of Samod and Thakur Gulab Singhji Chaturbhujot of Bagru.

The Rajput forces of Jaipur had slaughtered around more than 400 Maratha warriors in a few hours ,Marathas finally fled the battle, leaving dead soldiers.
The result finally came to be a decisive Rajput victory.

Result
The Marathas were badly defeated in the battle by Rajputs

References

"Thirty Decisive Battles of Jaipur", pp. 201-203.
Kakkor
Kakkor